John Swallen is a retired American soccer player who played professionally with the Minnesota Thunder for twelve seasons.  Swallen, a goalkeeper, was named to the Thunder Hall of Fame in 2002, following the conclusion of his Thunder career.  Swallen was named the USL First Division (then known as the A League) MVP and goalkeeper of the year for the 1999 season.

References

Swallen has developed and runs programs for pre-schoolers (Minikickers), teaching them basic soccer skills.  He coaches an under 16 boys team, as well as numerous private coaching roles.  He lives in Shoreview, Mn.

Minnesota Thunder players
Association football goalkeepers
USL First Division players
1965 births
Living people
Ripon College (Wisconsin) alumni
People from Vadnais Heights, Minnesota
American soccer players